Mohamed Ali Ahmad Abdelaal (born 23 July 1990) is an Egyptian judoka. He competed at the 2016 Summer Olympics in the men's 81 kg event, in which he was eliminated by Khasan Khalmurzaev in the third round.

He competed at the 2020 Summer Olympics in the men's 81 kg event.

References

External links
 
 

1990 births
Living people
Egyptian male judoka
Judoka at the 2016 Summer Olympics
Olympic judoka of Egypt
African Games gold medalists for Egypt
African Games medalists in judo
Mediterranean Games silver medalists for Egypt
Mediterranean Games medalists in judo
Competitors at the 2015 African Games
Competitors at the 2018 Mediterranean Games
Sportsmanship
Judoka at the 2020 Summer Olympics
21st-century Egyptian people